Whitney Peak (born 28 January 2003) is a Ugandan-Canadian actress. She starred in the 2021 HBO Max revival of Gossip Girl. Her other work includes the Apple TV+ series Home Before Dark, the Netflix series Chilling Adventures of Sabrina and the Disney+ film Hocus Pocus 2.

Early life and education
Born in Kampala, Uganda, Peak is the youngest daughter of a Ugandan hairdresser and a Canadian pilot and engineer. She attended boarding school, was a competitive swimmer, and travelled with her father as a child. Her family relocated to Canada in 2012, settling in Port Coquitlam, British Columbia where Peak switched to a public school, including Terry Fox Secondary.

Filmography

References

External links

2003 births
Living people
21st-century Canadian actresses
21st-century Ugandan actresses
Actresses from British Columbia
Canadian child actresses
Canadian television actresses
People from Kampala
People from Port Coquitlam
Ugandan emigrants to Canada
Ugandan people of Canadian descent
Canadian people of Ugandan descent